Gunsan Airport  is an airport serving Gunsan, a city in the North Jeolla Province in South Korea. In 2019, 306,518 passengers used the airport. It shares its runway with Kunsan Air Base, which uses the same IATA and ICAO codes. Because Gunsan Airport is sharing with military, taking photograph or video of apron, runway and military facility is strictly prohibited.

History 
The routes between Seoul and Gunsan were opened in August 1970, but the airport was closed in 1974 due to the first oil shock, but the construction of the civil harbor facility started in November 1991 and reopened on December 14, 1992. On December 14, 1992, Korean Air (Korean Air) opened a new route to Seoul, Gunsan, Gunsan, and Jeju Island and was operated by Asiana Airlines in June 1996, but Asiana Airlines was suspended from service in October 2001. Since November 1992, it has been managed by the Gunsan Branch of the Korea Airport Corporation. As of 2004, the Gunsan - Jeju route will be operated.

Facilities

Airlines and destinations

See also
 Kunsan Air Base

References

External links
 Official site (in English)

Airports in South Korea
Gunsan
Buildings and structures in North Jeolla Province
Airports established in 1970
1970 establishments in South Korea
20th-century architecture in South Korea